Franco Ferraris (born 1 July 1919) is an Italian former diver. He was born in Naples. He competed at the 1936 Summer Olympics in Berlin, where he placed 22nd in 10 metre platform.

References

External links

1919 births
Possibly living people
Divers from Naples
Italian male divers
Olympic divers of Italy
Divers at the 1936 Summer Olympics